André Lauseig (8 January 1900 – 3 December 1972) was a French athlete. He competed in the men's individual cross country event at the 1924 Summer Olympics.

References

External links
 

1900 births
1972 deaths
Athletes (track and field) at the 1924 Summer Olympics
French male long-distance runners
Olympic athletes of France
Sportspeople from Gironde
Olympic cross country runners
20th-century French people